Bewafaa also romanised bewafa, is a Hindi-Urdu word meaning "unfaithful" or "disloyal".

It may refer to:

 Bewafa (1952 film), a Hindi film
 Bewafaa (2005 film), a Hindi film
 Bewafa Sanam, a 1995 Hindi film

See also
Bewafa (1952 film), 1952 Indian film
Bewafa (TV series), Pakistani television series
Wafa (disambiguation)